Suzanne Simone Baptiste Louverture (around 1742 – May 19, 1816 in Agen, France) was the wife of Toussaint Louverture and the "Dame-Consort" of the French colony of Saint-Domingue.

Family life

After being a coachman and a driver, Toussaint was freed at the age of thirty-three, and then married Suzanne Simone Baptiste.

Politics
When in 1801 the constitution appointed Toussaint as governor of Saint-Domingue, she received the title of "Dame-Consort."

Kidnapping
In 1802, Charles Leclerc's troops captured her along with her husband and the rest of her immediate family. Madame Louverture survived her husband, who died that same year, and her youngest child Saint-Jean, died in 1804 in Agen, France. She died in 1816, in the arms of her sons, Placide and Isaac.

See also
 Haitian Revolution
 Marie-Claire Heureuse Félicité
 Marie-Louise Coidavid

References

People of the Haitian Revolution
Women of the Haitian Revolution
Louverture family
First ladies and gentlemen of Haiti